Wangkheirakpam Tomba Singh (born 3 April 1982 in Imphal, Manipur) is an Indian former footballer who played as a midfielder. He is the current assistant coach of the I-League club NEROCA.

Career
Tomba began his footballing career with YWC, Thambalkhong in the junior level before his steep climb to the senior division.
After donning colours of ESU, Wangkhei and USA, Khurai Tomba also played a major role in the State team lifting the Under-19 national Football championship held at Imphal where the hosts defeated Sikkim 4–1 in the final.

Catching the eye of talent hunters at the Under-19 championship Tomba started playing for Air India since 1998 before moving to Salgaocar.

Career statistics

International

Honours

India U23
 LG Cup: 2002

Maharashtra
Santosh Trophy: 1999–2000

Manipur
Santosh Trophy: 2002–03

Individual
 AIFF Player of the Year: 2003

References

External links 
 
 Profile at Goal.com

1982 births
Living people
People from Imphal
Footballers from Manipur
I-League players
Association football midfielders
India international footballers
India youth international footballers
Indian footballers
Air India FC players
Salgaocar FC players
Mohun Bagan AC players
East Bengal Club players
Churchill Brothers FC Goa players
Rangdajied United F.C. players
Bharat FC players
Southern Samity players
Footballers at the 2002 Asian Games
Asian Games competitors for India